Mumble Bumble is a children's animated television series created by Christian Skjøtt and produced by Egmont Imagination and the CINAR Corporation (now WildBrain).

Overview and production
It follows the adventures of an imaginative blue hippopotamus named Mumble Bumble, the title character, and his best friends, Chic'o, the inquisitive chicken, and Greens, the busy frog who never looks before he leaps. Recurring characters include Roc and Oink.  The idea, which is designed to be both educational and entertaining for a preschool audience, was devised by a mastermind named Christian Skjøtt, creator of the show.

Television airing
In Canada, it was broadcast on CBC Television and on Knowledge Kids. In foreign countries, it was also broadcast on Rai 3 in Italy, CITV and Tiny Living in the United Kingdom, Network 2 in Ireland, La Cinquième in France, Kindernet in the Netherlands, ZAZ in Mexico, SABC2 and on e.tv in South Africa, ABS-CBN in the Philippines, and ATV in Hong Kong. It did not air in the U.S.

References

External links
 

CBC Television original programming
Canadian children's animated adventure television series
Canadian children's animated fantasy television series
Television series by Cookie Jar Entertainment
1990s Canadian animated television series
2000s Canadian animated television series
1998 Canadian television series debuts
2000 Canadian television series endings
Canadian preschool education television series
Animated preschool education television series
1990s preschool education television series
2000s preschool education television series
Animated television series about mammals